Nnadubem Gabriel Enyinaya Muoneke (born 7 February 1978, in Ann Arbor, Michigan) is a Nigerian American professional basketball player. Despite being born in the United States, Muoneke represents Nigeria internationally.

Muoneke attended Cypress Falls High School in northwest Houston, Texas. After graduation, he enrolled at the University of Texas at Austin, from which he graduated in 2000 with his degree in Petroleum Engineering. After starting for 4 years on the school's basketball team, Muoneke went undrafted out of college. He is ranked in the top 15 in the history of University of Texas basketball in both scoring and rebounding. He was a first round pick of the Columbus Riverdragons (now Austin Spurs) then the Roanoke Dazzle also of the NBDL. He has played in multiple NBA summer leagues including that of the Vancouver Grizzlies and the New Orleans Hornets. Muoneke also signed non-guaranteed NBA contracts with the Detroit Pistons, Houston Rockets, Charlotte Bobcats and the Utah Jazz but was waived from all four teams.

Muoneke has played around the world, including with the Ponce Lions in Puerto Rico, Pınar Karşıyaka in Turkey, the Beijing Olympians in China, Busan KTF Magic Wings, Seoul SK Knights in South Korea, Caceres in Spain and Saba Battery in Iran, among other places.

Since November 2007, Muoneke has been maintaining a blog on Hoopshype.com, where he discusses his playing career, life in foreign countries, and politics.

In Winter 2007-08 he signed a contract with '07-'08 ACB Champion and Euroleague Final Four Participant, Saski Baskonia of the Spanish ACB to replace the injured James Singleton. When the contract expired, the team's renewal offer was not accepted by Muoneke and both parties mutually parted ways.

During his time in China, Muoneke broke many scoring records and was amongst the top scorers in China in all three of his seasons in the country. While playing for the Yunnan Running Bulls, Muoneke was physically attacked during a postgame confrontation between himself and Chinese national team captain and Shanghai Sharks player Liu Wei. After Muoneke and the Sharks' Cai Liang wrestled for the ball during the game, Cai, Liu and some Sharks players confronted Muoneke, his wife, children and mother-in-law as they were leaving the stadium. Muoneke had a water bottle thrown at him, before being chased and cornered by the players. Liu and Cai were subsequently fined and suspended. The Shanghai Sharks were also fined. Muoneke was not injured.

He signed with ASVEL Villeurbanne for the 2008-09 season, but was released in September.  He then signed with the Utah Jazz but was waived in October.

On his blog in 2009, he alluded to a retirement from professional basketball  and subsequently did retire at the age of 30.

Muoneke then continued his career in African oil and gas in 2010 and has apparently started his own company in his parents' home country of Nigeria.

Career 
  Fort Wayne Fury (2000)
  Chicago Skyliners (2000)
  Trenton Shooting Stars (2000)
  Pınar Karşıyaka (2000–2001)
  Boca Juniors (2001)
  Columbus Riverdragons (2001–2002)
  Santurce Crabbers (2002)
  Purefoods TJ Hot Dogs (2002)
  Roanoke Dazzle (2002–2003)
  CB Cáceres (2003)
  Beijing Aoshen (2003–2004)
  Coamo Marathon Runners (2004)
  Busan KTF Magic Wings (2004–2005)
  Coamo Marathon Runners (2005)
  Seoul SK Knights (2005–2006)
  Ponce Lions (2006)
  Zhejiang Guangsha (2006–2007)
  Saba Battery (2007)
  Rio Grande Valley Vipers (2007)
  TAU Cerámica (2007–2008)
  Saba Battery (2008)
  ASVEL Villeurbanne (2008)
  Yunnan Bulls (2008–2009)

Notes

External links
 Gabe Muoneke NBA.com Player Profile
 Basketpedya.com Player Profile
 Gabe Muoneke NBA.com/D-League
 Muoneke Summer League Statistics 2006
 Gabe Muoneke Hoopshype.com
  Muoneke's Blog On Hoopshype.com

1978 births
Living people
African-American basketball players
American expatriate basketball people in Argentina
American expatriate basketball people in China
American expatriate basketball people in France
American expatriate basketball people in Iran
American expatriate basketball people in Italy
American expatriate basketball people in the Philippines
American expatriate basketball people in South Korea
American expatriate basketball people in Spain
American expatriate basketball people in Turkey
American sportspeople of Nigerian descent
ASVEL Basket players
Basketball players from Ann Arbor, Michigan
Beijing Olympians players
Boca Juniors basketball players
Suwon KT Sonicboom players
Cangrejeros de Santurce basketball players
Columbus Riverdragons players
Fort Wayne Fury players
Karşıyaka basketball players
Leones de Ponce basketball players
Liga ACB players
Magnolia Hotshots players
Maratonistas de Coamo players
Nigerian expatriate basketball people in Turkey
Nigerian men's basketball players
Philippine Basketball Association imports
Power forwards (basketball)
Rio Grande Valley Vipers players
Roanoke Dazzle players
Seoul SK Knights players
Texas Longhorns men's basketball players
Trenton Shooting Stars players
Zhejiang Lions players
2006 FIBA World Championship players
American men's basketball players
Nigerian expatriate basketball people in the Philippines
21st-century African-American sportspeople
20th-century African-American sportspeople